Cicero is a station on the Chicago Transit Authority's 'L' system, serving the Pink Line. The station was the site of an accident in 1979 in which a train derailed and hit the station, stopping just short of the ticket agent's booth. The station is located in Cicero, Illinois.

Bus connections
CTA
  21 Cermak 
  54 Cicero 
  54B South Cicero 
  N60 Blue Island/26th Night Bus (Owl Service) 

Pace
  302 Ogden/Stanley (Monday-Saturday only) 
  392 Green Line Cicero CTA/UPS Hodgkins (Weekday UPS shifts only)

Notes and references

Notes

References

External links 

Cicero (Douglas Line) Station Page
CTA Cicero (Pink Line) Station Page
Cicero Avenue entrance from Google Maps Street View
49th Avenue entrance from Google Maps Street View

Cicero, Illinois
CTA Pink Line stations
Railway stations in the United States opened in 1907
1907 establishments in Illinois